Lvovo may refer to:

L'vovo Derrango, a South African Kwaito singer; see 
; see 
Lvovo, Tambov Oblast, a village (selo) in Tambov Oblast, Russia

See also
 Lev (disambiguation)
 Lvov (disambiguation)
 Lvovsky (disambiguation)